Fahrig is surname. Notable people with the surname include:

Lenore Fahrig, Canadian academic
Matthias Fahrig (born 1985), German gymnast
Stephan Fahrig (1968–2017), German lightweight rower and sports scientist

See also
Fahri